Bassana is a village in the Bana Department of Balé Province in south-western Burkina Faso. In 2008, The village had a population of 918.

References

Populated places in the Boucle du Mouhoun Region
Balé Province